The Church of the Annunciation, also called the Church of the Annunciation of the Blessed Virgin Mary, is a North Philadelphia Episcopal church in the Episcopal Diocese of Pennsylvania. It has an historic Anglo-Catholic liturgical identity. Its original name as a mission congregation beginning in 1870 was the Church of Our Merciful Saviour until 1882. Founded formally in 1880, it had 580 active members in 1960, but reported 19 in 2019; it did not file a 2020 parochial report.

The church's first rector was Hermon Griswold Batterson, third rector of S. Clement's, Philadelphia, following the end of his tenure at that church over protracted ritualist disputes and accusations of sexual misconduct in the early 1870s. In 1943, Annunciation absorbed the congregation of St. Christopher's Episcopal Church, which ended its own separate corporate existence in 1947. Annunciation BVM's congregation was mostly African American by the middle of the twentieth century.

The parish's first Romanesque building was located at Twelfth and Diamond Streets in Philadelphia. Ground was broken on April 20, 1882, followed by the laying of a cornerstone on June 26, 1884. The church building included elements by the New York architectural firm of Heins & LaFarge. It included a bell tower, an adjacent parish house for educational and parochial activities, and free sittings for 650 persons in addition to a large chancel for acolytes and choristers. The reredos was painted by Anita Sargent and Marianna Sloan. 

Incense was first used in 1888, and the Blessed Sacrament was reserved from February 4, 1896 onward. It was among the first Anglican churches anywhere in the world to practice Benediction of the Blessed Sacrament and eucharistic exposition. Nuns from the Sisterhood of the Holy Nativity worked in the parish as visitors, sacristans, and educators. The parish also had a close connection to the Order of the Holy Cross, an Anglican religious order for men in which long-time rector the Rev. Robert C. Hofmeister was a postulant twice in the 1960s. The church occasionally shared services with St. Alban's Church, Olney, another small Philadelphia Anglo-Catholic parish.

The first church burned on the night of April 6, 1990 but its parish hall was used for worship briefly after that time. Its congregation also worshiped with S. Clement's Church following the fire. The remains of the church were demolished at an unknown date. The congregation then moved to a new building in Northwest Philadelphia near Mount Airy.

The church previously had a large number of internal organizations, including a Sunday school, Episcopal Church Women, the Guild of St. Vincent for Acolytes, S. Mary's Guild, S. Elizabeth's Guild, S. Laurence's Guild, S. Agnes' Guild, St. Ambrose Guild, and wards of the Guild of All Souls and the Confraternity of the Blessed Sacrament. Several of its clergy were also associated with the Congregation of the Companions of the Holy Saviour (CSSS), an Anglo-Catholic fraternity for celibate  male priests.

Notable clergy
Hermon Griswold Batterson (1827-1903) first rector (1880-1889)
Nalbro Frazier Robinson (rector 1889-1892)
Daniel Ingalls Odell (1811-1889, rector from 1892)
Carl I. Shoemaker
Robert S. Harris, CSSS
Frank Williamson, Jr. CSSS
Robert Clayton Hofmeister CSSS (1931-2003, curate from 1960-1961, rector from 1971-1993)

Bibliography
Charter, By-Laws and Rules of Order of the Church of the Annunciation

External links
Historical material on the Church of the Annunciation from Philadelphia Studies
Episcopal Diocese of Pennsylvania

1870 establishments in Pennsylvania
Christian organizations established in the 1870s
Churches in Philadelphia
Episcopal Church in Pennsylvania
Religious organizations established in 1870
19th-century Episcopal church buildings
Anglo-Catholic church buildings in the United States